Rangpur Medical College (RpMC) is a public medical college located in Rangpur, Bangladesh. The college is founded in 1972 and affiliated with Rajshahi Medical University.

History
To meet the growing needs of modern medicine the government established a medical college in Dhap, Rangpur (on the property of Pandit family of Rangpur) in 1970 with a 500-bed teaching hospital. The first batch of 50 students were admitted to Rangpur Medical College, affiliated with Rajshahi University, in 1971. Currently, the yearly intake has been increased to more than two hundred. The 4th batch is doing intern duty. And the most recent batch of 2022 is the 51st.

Campus
The campus of Rangpur Medical College is located in the northwest area of Rangpur, Bangladesh. It is 210 kilometres from the Rajshahi District and 330 kilometres from Dhaka and is located next to the inter-country highway that connects India to Nepal.There is a three-storied college building and a five-storied Hospital building with 1200 beds. Besides there are Boys and ladies hostels, stuff quarters, Nursing college, Playgrounds, Banks and  one Institute of nuclear medicine and allied science.

Academics
The admission process of undergraduate MBBS course for all government medical colleges in Bangladesh is conducted centrally by the Director of Medical Education under DGHS under the Ministry of Health (Bangladesh). The test comprises a written MCQ exam, which is held simultaneously in all government medical colleges on the same day throughout the country. Candidates are selected for admission based on national merit and district, whether they are sons or daughters of freedom fighters, and to fill tribal quotas. For foreign students, admission is through the embassy of Bangladesh in their respective countries. The academic calendar for different years is maintained by respective departments. Aside from the MBBS course there are post graduation courses in surgery, medicine, gynaecology,paediatrics,neurosurgeryAnatomy,physiology,pathology,forensic medicine, ophthalmology, orthopedic surgery, ENT and anaesthesiology . Postgraduate and diploma courses admission tests are conducted by BSMMU centrally. The admission test consists of the written MCQ exam.
The medical college have separate dental unit & offers Bachelor of Dental Surgery (BDS) course. The college have a journal named journal of rangpur medical college which is BMDC recognized and indexed in banglajol and crossref.

Extracurricular activities
SANDHANI, Medicine Club, and Friends Foundation are voluntary organizations of students of this medical college.

References

External links 

 Official English Website
 Official Bengali Website

Medical colleges in Bangladesh
Hospitals in Bangladesh
Educational institutions established in 1970
1970 establishments in East Pakistan
Rangpur, Bangladesh